Velachery aeri, or Velachery lake, is one of the lakes inside Chennai, in the Indian state of Tamil Nadu, with a good stock of water all through the year. Since Velachery is a low-lying area, the monsoon rain water from the neighbouring areas are drained into this lake.

The ambitious programme of the corporation was conceived three years ago. The local body had even engaged a consultant, shortlisted by experts from Anna University, Public Works Department and the agriculture department. The consultant gave a detailed plan in October last on how to beautify the lake. This included removal of encroachments in Gandhi Nagar and Ambedkar Nagar, fencing of the entire waterbody, provision of three decks for walking, viewing and fishing and a boating jetty. The consultant also suggested plantation of African grass, reed and bamboo along the middle deck and flowering plants and trees like bottlebrush, bougainvillea, royal palms and areca nut betel palms along the upper deck.

The rapid pace of real estate development in the last two decades resulted in the shrinking of the waterbody from 265 acres to 55 acres now. The government allocated 53 acres to the Tamil Nadu Housing Board and 34 acres to the Tamil Nadu Slum Clearance Board for housing development. Local residents have expressed concerns that the encroachers on Erikkarai Street in Gandhi Nagar, who don't have sewage connections, are contributing to the pollution of the lake.

See also

Water management in Chennai

Lakes of Tamil Nadu
Lakes of Chennai